Coleophora monardae is a moth of the family Coleophoridae. It is found in Canada, including Ontario.

The larvae feed on the leaves of Monarda fistulosa. They create a trivalved, tubular silken case.

References

monardae
Moths described in 1945
Moths of North America